Winyé, or Kolsi, is a Gur language of Burkina Faso. Speakers are largely monolingual.

References

Languages of Burkina Faso
Gurunsi languages